Karl-Heinz Holze (30 June 1930 – 11 June 2000) was a German footballer. He was one of the top goal scorers of SC Dynamo Berlin in the 1954-55 DDR-Oberliga.

External links

1930 births
2000 deaths
German footballers
East German footballers
East Germany international footballers
Dynamo Dresden players
Berliner FC Dynamo players
DDR-Oberliga players
Association football forwards